Danny DiPrima (born October 30, 1991) is an American soccer player who currently plays for the Harrisburg Heat in the Major Arena Soccer League.

Career
Diprima played his youth soccer for JBS FC a premier club based out of Westchester County, New York and was coached by Jonathan Langer. While at JBS FC Diprima helped lead his JBS FC team to Tournament Titles at the Disney Soccer Showcase, Potomac Memorial Day Tournament, Annandale Premier Cup, etc..
DiPrima played college soccer at St. John's University in 2010, before transferring to North Carolina State University in 2011.

DiPrima signed with USL Pro club Harrisburg City Islanders on March 27, 2014.

References

External links
 
 Lipscomb University bio

1991 births
Living people
American soccer players
St. John's Red Storm men's soccer players
NC State Wolfpack men's soccer players
Harrisburg Heat players
Penn FC players
Harrisburg Heat (MASL) players
Association football midfielders
Soccer players from Pennsylvania
Major Arena Soccer League players
USL Championship players
People from Dillsburg, Pennsylvania